Jadwiga Rappé (born 24 February 1952) is a Polish operatic contralto, born in Toruń. Rappé studied Slavic philology at the University of Warsaw and voice at the Wroclaw Music Academy. In 1980 she was awarded first prize at the International Bach Competition in Leipzig. She made her professional opera debut at the Grand Theatre, Warsaw, in 1983 and has since remained a regular artist at that theatre. She has sung leading roles with other opera houses internationally, including the Deutsche Oper Berlin and the Royal Opera House in London.

References

Further reading

External links
 (in Polish)
Biography, images, recordings, bach-cantatas.com

Living people
1952 births
People from Toruń
20th-century Polish women opera singers
Operatic contraltos
21st-century Polish women opera singers